Cyrus Fees (born March 15, 1982) is a television and media personality based in The United States of America (USA), who is best known for his work as a ring announcer for Ultimate Fighting Championships, Dana White's Contender Series host for Bare Knuckle Fighting Championship, and play-by-play commentator for Eagle Fighting Championship.

Fees's trademark is being able to serve as both play-by-play commentator and ring announcer simultaneously, which he does presently for international MMA promotions Extreme Fighting Championship (EFC) and UAE Warriors. Cyrus is currently also employed by Bare Knuckle Fighting Championship, Eagle Fighting Championship, North Star Combat, Showcase MMA, and has provided post-production commentary for Oktagon, German MMA Championships, Enfusion, and other various organizations through distribution company Fighting Spirit MMA.

Career

MMA: Inside The Cage (2010–2014)

Between 2010-2014 Cyrus Fees and Casey Oxendine co-hosted MMA: Inside The Cage (MMA: ITC) on Tuff TV, Fight Now TV and youtube. The show grew into a global "around the grounds" of combat sports promotions from 6 continents. The Dirty Dozen Clips of the Week featured on MMA: ITC from 2010 and was a popular segment of Knockouts and submission victories. Viewers voted via the website for the best clip. Winning fighters from around the globe received a prize package from MMA: ITC sponsors including Elevation Training Mask.

Holston Valley Broadcasting (2011–2012)

Fees was the first News anchor for the newly relaunched news program on ABC 19 WKPT-TV News from 2011-2012. Cyrus decided to pursue full-time commentary and ring announcing after his tenure at WKPT-TV.

Hip Show: Arena Combat (2012–2014)

After its debut in 2012, Russian combat television program The Hip Show, will be produced into an international series for global release in 2014. "Hip Show: Arena Combat" is a teams based MMA concept that features a Gladiators style obstacle course. Cyrus Fees and Casey Oxendine initially provided English language commentary for the Russian series which was featured on AXS TV in March 2014. The international series features the same 2 on 2 team MMA concept and begun filming in the USA in August 2014, with Fees and Oxendine as co-owners. The first international show was featured on In Demand PPV during October 2014.

Xtreme Fighting Championships (2012–Present)
Since 2012, Cyrus has held the ring announcing duties at Xtreme Fighting Championships, based in the USA and Brazil. The broadcasts are currently seen on NBCSN, GOTV HD, and other various international outlets. Fees also serves on the commentary team handling preliminary fights alongside Pat Miletich.

UAE Warriors (2012-Present)
In 2012, Cyrus debuted with the company on their inaugural event, Abu Dhabi Warriors 1. At Abu Dhabi Warriors 2, he was also given the play-by-play duties. Fees continued to do both ring announcing and commentary for the promotion for all events.

Cage Warriors Fighting Championship (2013)

In 2013 Cyrus featured on CWFC 54 in the absence of veteran ring announcer Joe A. Martinez and broadcast live via Fight Now TV and syndicated globally on ESPN International.

Australian Fighting Championship and Combat8 (2013)

A regular visitor to Australia in 2013 Fees provided play-by-play commentary on the Australian Fighting Championship (AFC) and Combat8 (C8) promotions. Fees provided play-by-play commentary for AFC 4,5 and 6, which were streamed live via epicentre.tv and C8:03/04 featured on Fox Sports (Australia).

Global Force Wrestling (2015)
On July 24, 2015, Fees was announced as the play-by-play commentator for professional wrestling promotion Global Force Wrestling's Amped program.

EFC Worldwide (Africa) (2015-Present) 
Fees joined the EFC Worldwide promotion in April 2015 as play-by-play commentator.  At EFC 57, the promotion asked Fees to step in as hexagon announcer, as well as still provide the event commentary. At present, Cyrus Fees is still providing both commentary and hexagon announcing.

Brave Combat Federation (2016-2018) 
Fees was announced as play-by-play commentator for the new Brave Combat Federation promotion based out of Bahrain. During his tenure, Fees provided commentary alongside notable fighters including Frankie Edgar, Cris Cyborg, Jose "Shorty" Torres, and Alex "Extremo" Soto.

Absolute Championship Berkut (2017) 
At ACB 54 in Manchester, England, Fees stepped in as cage announcer for the Absolute Championship Berkut promotion. Cyrus served in the position throughout 2017, working in Russia, Canada, Brazil, Belarus, Poland, Australia, and the UK. In December 2017, Fees parted ways with ACB to begin working with rival promotion Fight Nights Global.

References 

1982 births
Living people
Mixed martial arts announcers
Public address announcers
Professional wrestling announcers